Coarse facial features or coarse facies describes a constellation of facial features that are present in many inborn errors of metabolism.

Features include:
 large, bulging head
 prominent scalp veins
 "saddle-like, flat bridged nose with broad, fleshy tip"
 large lips and tongue
 small, widely spaced and/or malformed teeth
 hypertrophic alveolar ridges and/or gums

Heads tend to be longer than normal from front to back, with a bulging forehead. This is because of the earlier than normal or premature fusion of skull bones in an affected individual.

Causes
Several conditions are associated with coarse facial features.

Acromegaly
Alpha-mannosidosis type II
Aspartylglycosaminuria
Battaglia Neri syndrome
Börjeson–Forssman–Lehmann syndrome
Chromosome 6q deletion syndrome
Coarse face - hypotonia - constipation
Congenital hypothyroidism
Dandy–Walker malformation (with mental retardation basal ganglia disease and seizures)
Dyggve–Melchior–Clausen syndrome
Fucosidosis type 1
Fucosidosis type II
Gangliosidosis generalized GM1 (type 1)
Gangliosidosis GM1 (type 3)
GM1 gangliosidosis
Goldberg syndrome
Hyde-Forster-Mccarthy-Berry syndrome
Hyper IgE
Hypomelanosis of Ito
I cell disease
Immunodeficiency due to defect in MAPBP-interacting protein
Infantile sialic acid storage disorder
Job syndrome
Mannosidosis (alpha B lysosomal)
McCune–Albright syndrome
Mental retardation (X-linked - epilepsy - progressive joint contractures - typical face)
Mental retardation (X-linked Raynaud type)
Miescher's syndrome
Morquio syndrome
Morquio syndrome type A
Morquio syndrome type B
MPS 3 C
MPS 3 D
Mucolipidosis III
Mucopolysaccharidosis type 2 Hunter syndrome- mild form
Mucopolysaccharidosis type 2 Hunter syndrome- severe form
Mucopolysaccharidosis type 3
Mucopolysaccharidosis type 6
Mucopolysaccharidosis type 7 Sly syndrome
Mucopolysaccharidosis type I Hurler syndrome
Mucopolysaccharidosis type I Hurler/Scheie syndrome
Mucopolysaccharidosis type I Scheie syndrome
Multiple endocrine abnormalities - adenylyl cyclase dysfunction
Multiple endocrine neoplasia type 2B
Neuraminidase deficiency (type II juvenile form)
Nodulosis–arthropathy–osteolysis syndrome
Nonkeratan-sulfate-excreting Morquio syndrome
Pituitary tumors (adult)
Sialidosis type II (congenital)
Sialidosis type II (infantile)
Sialuria syndrome
Simpson–Golabi–Behmel syndrome
Simpson–Golabi–Behmel syndrome - type 1 (SGBS1)
Skeletal dysplasia - coarse facies - mental retardation
Spondyloepimetaphyseal dysplasia (genevieve type)
Sulfatidosis juvenile (Austin type)
Winchester syndrome

See also
 Facies (medical)

References

External links 
https://web.archive.org/web/20090106211640/http://www.mps1disease.com/patient/about/mps_pt_symptom_coarse_facial_features.asp

Facial features